Rab GTPase-binding effector protein 1 is an enzyme that in humans is encoded by the RABEP1 gene. It belongs to rabaptin protein family.

Interactions 

RABEP1 has been shown to interact with:

 AP1G1, 
 GGA1,
 GGA2, 
 RAB4A,  and
 RAB5A.

References

Further reading